Siarhei Charnou (born 5 February 1979, in Minsk) is a Belarusian race walker. His name is also spelled as Sergey Chernov.

Achievements

References

sports-reference

1979 births
Living people
Belarusian male racewalkers
Athletes from Minsk
Athletes (track and field) at the 2008 Summer Olympics
Olympic athletes of Belarus